Mark Leo Goodson (January 14, 1915 – December 18, 1992) was an American television producer who specialized in game shows, most frequently with his business partner Bill Todman, with whom he created Goodson-Todman Productions.

Early life and early career
Goodson was born in Sacramento, California, on January 14, 1915. His parents, Abraham Ellis (1875–1954) and Fannie Goodson (1887–1986), emigrated from Russia in the early 1900s. As a child, Goodson acted in amateur theater with the Plaza Stock Company. The family later moved to Hayward, California. Originally intending to become a lawyer, Goodson attended the University of California, Berkeley. He financed his education through scholarships and by working at the Lincoln Fish Market. He graduated Phi Beta Kappa in 1937 with a degree in economics.

That year, he began his broadcasting career in San Francisco, working as a disc jockey at radio station KJBS (now KFAX). In 1939, he joined radio station KFRC, where he produced and hosted a radio quiz called Pop the Question in which contestants selected questions by throwing darts at multicolored balloons.

Television production
Goodson and long-time partner Bill Todman produced some of the longest-running game shows in US television history, and their names were well known at least to the large audiences for these shows. Their first television show, Winner Take All, debuted on CBS television on July 1, 1948. The long list of Goodson-Todman productions includes The Price Is Right, Family Feud, Classic Concentration, Match Game, Password, Beat the Clock, To Tell the Truth (Goodson's personal favorite show), I've Got a Secret, What's My Line?, Card Sharks, and Tattletales.  Goodson-Todman Productions/Mark Goodson Productions created content for U.S. channels and other international channels. (including Talbot Television Ltd. and Fremantle UK Productions Ltd.). such as CBS, NBC, and ABC in the US, BBC1, ITV (Anglia, Central, Granada, LWT, TVS, Scottish Television, and Yorkshire Television), Channel 4, and Sky One, (also Challenge TV). It licensed many of its shows to the Reg Grundy Organisation to be adapted in Australia and Europe.

Goodson and Todman's shows endured through the decades, many over multiple runs, because of Goodson's sharp eye for production and presentation, and their strict insistence on maintaining clean, honest contests, thus allowing their shows to survive the quiz-show scandals of the late 1950s. After those scandals wiped out most of their competition, much of the newer game-show output of the 1960s and 1970s  came from either Goodson-Todman or companies launched by their former employees: Merv Griffin, Bob Stewart, Monty Hall, and later Jay Wolpert. Goodson-Todman was involved with Jack Barry's comeback vehicle The Joker's Wild for its 1969 pilot, but ended involvement with the show before it debuted in 1972.

While Todman oversaw the company's lucrative businesses outside of television, Goodson handled the creative aspects of producing game shows. The people who worked for the company and created most of the Goodson-Todman shows were pivotal to the success of those shows. Goodson-Todman executives Bob Stewart, Bob Bach, Gil Fates, Ira Skutch, Frank Wayne, Chester Feldman, Paul Alter, Howard Felsher, Ted Cooper, Jay Wolpert, and others were instrumental in making the shows successful.

The company proved itself to be masterful at games, but was not as successful when it tried other fields of television programs, including the anthology dramas The Web and The Richard Boone Show, a talk-variety show for famed insult comic Don Rickles – and what was possibly the company's biggest failure, a sitcom titled One Happy Family.

Goodson-Todman Productions was also involved with three Westerns: Jefferson Drum (1958–59), starring Jeff Richards as a newspaper editor in the Old West; The Rebel (1959–1961), starring Nick Adams as a former Confederate soldier who traveled to the West after the American Civil War (Johnny Cash sang the theme); and Branded, starring Chuck Connors as a soldier who had wrongly been given a dishonorable discharge from the Army.

For many years, the company was headquartered in the Seagram Building at 375 Park Avenue in New York City. Most of the company's production moved to Hollywood in the early 1970s (as did many other production companies), starting with the ABC revival of Password in 1971. The Los Angeles offices were based at 6430 Sunset Boulevard, moving to 5750 Wilshire Boulevard. The company's last New York-based show was the 1980 version of To Tell the Truth, but the New York office remained open and was used for East Coast Child's Play auditions.

A few years after Bill Todman's death in 1979, Goodson acquired the Todman heirs' share of the company, and in 1982, the company was renamed Mark Goodson Productions. Traditionally, shows signed off with "This is (announcer's name) speaking for (show name), A Mark Goodson-Bill Todman Production/A Mark Goodson Television Production." After Goodson's death, to pay off a massive inheritance tax, Goodson's family sold the rights (except for Concentration/Classic Concentration, which had been licensed from NBC) to All-American Television, which was subsequently taken over by Pearson PLC (an educational publisher and communications company based in the United Kingdom), and, in turn, was acquired by RTL Group (a division of Bertelsmann), to form Fremantle, which now owns the rights to the library from Mark Goodson Productions. The Mark Goodson Productions name, logo, and announcement continued to be used for some shows until 2007, when Bob Barker's last episode of The Price Is Right aired. Afterwards, at the close of each episode of The Price Is Right, the announcer credits the show as "a FremantleMedia Production" until 2018; it is now credited simply as "a Fremantle Production", reflecting the name change of the company.

Copyrights to many of the Goodson-Todman's game shows were assigned to its specially formed companies, named in The (program name) Company scheme, such as The Family Company, The Password Company etc. They are currently in-name-only units of Fremantle North America.

In 1990, Goodson received the Emmy Award "Lifetime Achievement Award for Daytime Television", which was presented to him by Betty White. Two years later, in 1992, Goodson earned induction into the Television Hall of Fame.

Foreign versions
Many Goodson-Todman games were produced internationally, some under different titles, and were distributed by Reg Grundy Productions. Family Feud was known in the United Kingdom as Family Fortunes, and Card Sharks went under the title Play Your Cards Right. In Germany, Match Game was known  as Schnickschnack (loosely translated, "something, anything" and used as a counterpart for the word "blank", for which German has no direct word). In the United Kingdom, it was known as Blankety Blank, while in Australia, it was known as Blankety Blanks (which, coincidentally, was the title of an unrelated American game show, created by former Goodson-Todman staffer Bob Stewart).

Shows
Of the numerous shows Goodson produced in his lifetime, three are currently on the air: The Price Is Right, which has run continuously since 1972; Family Feud, which ran in two different iterations during 1976–1985 and 1988–1995, and was revived in its current form in 1999;  and To Tell the Truth, which was revived in 2016 after a lengthy stint off the air. All revivals since 1994 have been produced by successor companies (All-American Television from 1994 to 1998, Pearson Television from 1998 to 2002, FremantleMedia from 2002 to 2018, and Fremantle since 2018).

Mark Goodson–Bill Todman Productions (1948–1982)

All-Star Family Feud Special (ABC 1978–1984)
About Last Night (HBO Max 2022; a remake of Tattlettales) produced by Sweet July Productions and Unanimous Media
Beat the Clock (CBS, ABC 1950–1961, 1969–1974, CBS 1979–1980 copyrighted as The Clock Co., 2002–2003 copyrighted as Tick Tock Productions, Ltd., 2018–2019)
The Better Sex (ABC 1977–1978)
Blade Rider, Revenge of the Indian Nations (1966)
Blockbusters (NBC 1980–1982, NBC 1987); UK version produced from 1983 to 1995
Branded (NBC 1965–1967)
Broken Sabre (1965)
By Popular Demand (CBS 1950)
Call My Bluff (NBC 1965)
Card Sharks (NBC 1978–1981, CBS/Syn 1986–1989, Syn 2001–2002, ABC 2019–2021) copyrighted as Suzanne Productions (later MG Productions), and The Card Sharks Company.
Celebrity Family Feud (2008, 2015–present)
Choose Up Sides (NBC 1956)
Concentration and Classic Concentration (Syn 1973–1978, NBC 1987–1991) copyrighted as G-T Enterprises and The Concentration Company
The Don Rickles Show (ABC 1968–1969)
Double Dare (CBS 1976–1977)
(The New) Family Feud (Challenge) (ABC 1976–1985, CBS 1988–1995, 1999–present) copyrighted by The Family Company, The New Family Company, Feudin' Productions, and Wanderlust Productions
Get the Message (ABC 1964)
Goodyear Theatre (NBC 1957–1960)
He Said, She Said (Syn 1969–1970)
It's News to Me (CBS 1951–1953, 1954)
I've Got a Secret (CBS 1952–1967, Syn 1972–1973, 1976, 2000–2001, 2006)  produced by Oxygen Media LLC in the 2000–01 version and Burt DuBrow Productions in association with Get Real Entertainment in the 2006 version
Jefferson Drum (1958–1959)
Judge for Yourself (NBC 1953–1954)
Las Vegas Beat (1961)
Make the Connection (1955)
Match Game (NBC 1962–1969, CBS 1973–1982, 1990–1991, 1998–1999, 2016–2021) copyrighted as Sojourn Productions, Celebrity Productions, The Match Game Company, and others.
Million Dollar Password (2008–09)
Mindreaders (NBC 1979–80, unrelated to the 1975 pilot)
Missing Links (NBC, ABC 1963–1964)
The Name's the Same (ABC 1951–1954, 1954–1955)
Now You See It (CBS 1974–1975, 1989) copyrighted as Suzanne Productions and The Now You See It Company
Number Please (ABC 1961)
One Happy Family (1961)
Password (CBS 1961–1967, ABC 1971–1975) copyrighted as Peak Productions.
Password Plus and Super Password (NBC 1979–1982, NBC 1984–1989) copyrighted as The Password Company and The Super Password Company.
Philip Marlowe (1959–60)
Play Your Hunch (CBS, ABC, NBC 1958–1963)
The Price Is Right (NBC, ABC 1956–1965, 1985–86, 1994–95, Syn 1972–1980, CBS 1972–present) copyrighted as Marbil Productions, Price Productions and The Price Is Right Productions. 
The Rebel (1959–1961)
The Richard Boone Show (1963–1964)
Ride Beyond Vengeance (1966)
Say When!! (NBC 1961–1965)
Showoffs (ABC 1975)
Snap Judgment (NBC 1967–1969)
Split Personality (NBC 1959–60)
Stop the Music (ABC 1948–1952, ABC 1954–1956) produced in association with Louis Cowan Productions
Tattletales (CBS, Syn 1974–1978, CBS 1982–1984) copyrighted as Panel Productions and The Tattletales Company.
That's My Line (CBS 1980–1981)
To Tell the Truth (CBS 1956–1968, Syn 1969–1978, Syn 1980–81, 1990–91, 2000–2002, 2016–present)
Two for the Money (CBS 1952–1956, NBC 1957)
What's Going On? (ABC 1954)
What's My Line? (CBS 1950–1967, Syn 1968–1975)
What's My Line? at 25 (ABC 1975)
The Web (CBS 1950–1954)
The Web (NBC 1957)
Winner Take All (CBS, NBC 1948–1950, 1951, 1952)

Mark Goodson Productions (1982–1996)
Body Language (CBS 1984–86)
Bonus Bonanza (1995)
Child's Play (CBS 1982–83)
Classic Concentration (NBC 1987–91) copyrighted as The Concentration Company, a subsidiary of NBC.
Come Back to the 5 and Dime, Jimmy Dean, Jimmy Dean (1982)
Flamingo Fortune (1995)
TV's Funniest Game Show Moments (1984)
TV's Funniest Game Show Moments #2 (1985)
Illinois Instant Riches (1994–96)
The Match Game-Hollywood Squares Hour (NBC 1983–1984)
Trivia Trap (ABC 1984–1985)

Personal life and final years
In 1941, Goodson married Bluma Neveleff and moved to New York City, where he teamed up with partner Bill Todman. The pair's first radio show, Winner Take All, premiered on CBS in 1946. Outside of television production, Goodson and Todman went on to own several newspapers in New England and purchased radio station KOL, Seattle, in 1962. Bill Todman died from a heart condition on July 29, 1979, two days before his 63rd birthday. In 1982, the Goodsons acquired the Todman heirs' portion of the company.

Goodson and Neveleff had two children, Jill (1942) and Jonathan (1945). They divorced and he married Virginia McDavid, a former Miss Alabama. In 1962, Goodson and McDavid had a daughter, Marjorie, who was a prize model on Classic Concentration from July 1987 until its finale in September 1991. In 1972, he married Suzanne Waddell, who had once been a guest on What's My Line? They divorced in 1978.

Death
Goodson died of pancreatic cancer on December 18, 1992 in New York City, a month before his 78th birthday. He is interred at Hillside Memorial Park in Culver City, California, along with his parents Fannie Goodson and A.E. Goodson. After his death, Bob Barker gave him a small tribute that aired after an episode of The Price Is Right, as an attached segment that followed the end credits:

 

Following was a portrait of Goodson and a message saying "Mark Goodson 1915-1992".

Legacy
Reruns of Goodson's shows have continued to dominate both the schedules of Game Show Network and Buzzr because his company saved most of the episodes of the shows, while other companies wiped theirs to reuse the tapes. The practice of wiping was stopped by the start of the 1980s.

Biography
On June 3, 2000, an episode of Biography called Mark Goodson: Will the Real Mark Goodson Please Stand Up? aired on A&E, where it profiled his life and career. This features many interviews of the hosts, panelists, and co-workers such as Betty White, Bob Barker, Gene Rayburn, Kitty Carlisle, Marjorie Goodson, and Suzanne Goodson.

2009 Game Show Awards
On June 6, 2009, an awards special that aired on GSN called 2009 Game Show Awards featured a brief tribute to Goodson as his daughter Marjorie held the Innovator Award herself.

Game Show Marathon

The series was based on the British format called Ant & Dec's/Vernon Kay's Gameshow Marathon and ran on CBS from May 31 until June 29, 2006 hosted by former actress/talk show host Ricki Lake, announced by Rich Fields (who formerly announced for The Price is Right from 2004 until 2010), and Todd Newton as the prize deliverer in which six celebrities (Lance Bass, Paige Davis, Tim Meadows, Kathy Najimi, Leslie Nielsen, and Brande Roderick) played seven classic game shows for their favorite charities and the home viewer featured five formats based on Goodson-Todman/Goodson shows along with the recreation of their original sets such as The Price is Right (1972 version), Beat the Clock, Card Sharks, Match Game and Family Feud.

Buzzr (YouTube)
From 2014 until 2016, the Buzzr brand was first used by its parent company FremantleMedia (now Fremantle) for its YouTube channel created by its digital-content studio Tiny Riot. The online channel features mostly classic clips along with its short-form reboots of its classic game-show properties using various internet celebrities as contestants. Four of the Goodson-Todman/Goodson shows that were rebooted are Family Feud, Password, Beat the Clock, and Body Language.

References

External links

 Museum of Broadcast Communications: Mark Goodson and Bill Todman
 This is a Mark Goodson-Bill Todman Production
 Goodson Collection
 Mark Goodson: Will the Real Mark Goodson Please Stand Up?
 Lords of Fun and Games|Sports Illustrated.com 
 A Mark Goodson Productions | Legacy.com
 'If I Stood Up Earlier...' By Mark Goodson January 13, 1991
 Myrna Oliver in the Los Angeles Times article about Mark Goodson from December 19, 1992
 Mark L Goodson (1915 - 1992) - Genealogy - Geni.com
 
  on the Emmy channel
 
 
 Mark Goodson's Profile
 Mark Goodson in Memory

1915 births
1992 deaths
Television producers from California
American people of Russian-Jewish descent
Deaths from pancreatic cancer
Burials at Hillside Memorial Park Cemetery
Businesspeople from Sacramento, California
Deaths from cancer in New York (state)
20th-century American businesspeople